Kimball (variants:  Kembal, Kembel, Kembell, Kemble, Kembold, Kembolde, Kemple, Kimbal, Kimball, Kimbel, Kimble) is a relatively common English language surname – it is also a given name, although relatively rare. It is Old Welsh for "war chief," Old Celtic for "leader of men," and Anglo-Saxon for "leader of the warriors."  Rudyard Kipling reports it as Old English for "kin bold, brave king."  As a given name, Kimball is often contracted to "Kim."
Kemball is also a place in Hitcham, Suffolk, England where the family originates from around the 14th Century.
The Scottish variant Kemble refer to a place (of origin) that  means "beautiful field".

Fictional characters
Kimball Cho, agent in the hit television show The Mentalist
Kimball Kinnison, hero of E. E. Smith‘s Galactic Patrol, the first novel in the Lensman series
Kimball O'Hara, the protagonist of Rudyard Kipling's novel Kim

English given names